Ignatius Joachim Karl Hood, known as Karl Hood, is a politician from the island nation of Grenada.  He served as an MP, Minister of Labour, Social Security and Ecclesiastical Affairs (2008-2010) and as Minister of Foreign Affairs (2010-2012) in a government led by former prime minister Tillman Thomas. He resigned as Minister of Foreign Affairs on 18 May 2012 after he abstained from a no-confidence vote against the government two days earlier. He currently serves as Grenada's High Commissioner to the United Kingdom.

References

Ministry webpage

Year of birth missing (living people)
Living people
Members of the House of Representatives of Grenada
Government ministers of Grenada
Foreign ministers of Grenada
People from Saint George Parish, Grenada
High Commissioners of Grenada to the United Kingdom
Ambassadors of Grenada to China
21st-century Grenadian politicians